Dayr Tarif was a Palestinian Arab village in the Ramle Subdistrict of Mandatory Palestine. It was depopulated during the 1948 Arab-Israeli War on July 10, 1948.

History
The Romans referred to Dayr Tarif as Bethariph.
According to SWP; "South-west of the village are traces of ruins, cisterns, and 'rock-sunk' tombs, evidently Christian again, as connected with a monastery."
Ceramics from the Byzantine era have been found here.

Ottoman era
They paid a  fixed tax rate of 25% on agricultural products, including wheat, barley, summer crops, vineyards, fruit trees, sesame,  goats and beehives, in addition to  occasional revenues; a total of  9,000 akçe.

In 1838 Deir Tureif was among the villages  Edward Robinson noted from the top of the White Mosque, Ramla.

In 1870, Victor Guérin estimated that the village had 400 inhabitants. He further noted ancient columns by the mosque. An Ottoman  village list from about the same year found that the village had  a population of 374, in a total of  93  houses, though the population count included men, only.   

In 1882  the PEF's Survey of Western Palestine (SWP) described the village as "A very small hamlet at the edge of the plain. This would seem to be the place called Betariph in the  'Onomasticon,' near Diospolis (Lod)."

British Mandate era
In the 1922 census of Palestine conducted by the British Mandate authorities, Dayr Tarif  had a population of 836; all Muslims,  increasing in the 1931 census to 1,246, still all Muslims, in a total of 291 houses.

An elementary school was founded in 1920 and by 1947, it had 171 students.

In the 1945 statistics the population was 1,750, all Muslims, while the total land area was 8,756 dunams, according to an official land and population survey.  Of this, a total of 1,410 dunams were used for citrus and bananas, 486 dunums were plantations or irrigated, 5,989 for cereals,  while 51 dunams were classified as built-up public areas.

1948, aftermath
Dayr Tarif was depopulated during the 1948 Arab-Israeli War on July 10, 1948, by the Ninth Commando Battalion of the Armored Brigade of Operation Dani. The village, with a population of 2,030, was defended by the Jordanian Army, but Dayr Tarif was mostly destroyed with the exception of its school, which serves as a stable. After it was conquered, the Palestinian population was expelled. The IDF asked for permission to destroy this village and a cluster of over a dozen others, after the commander Zvi Ayalon noted that they lacked sufficient manpower to occupy the area.

In 1992 the village site was described: "The site, covered with the debris of destroyed houses, is overgrown with thorns and other wild plants. A number of old olive and cypress trees are scattered across the site. The school building serves as a stable. Cotton and citrus are cultivated by Israelis on the surrounding lands."

References

Bibliography

External links
Welcome To Dayr Tarif
Dayr Tarif, Zochrot
Survey of Western Palestine, Map 14:    IAA, Wikimedia commons 
Dayr Tarif, from the Khalil Sakakini Cultural Center
Dayr Tarif, Palestine-family.net
Dayr Tarif, pictures, Palestine-family.net
Stories of the catastrophe: Exile, Interview with Naaseh Khaled Hamoudeh, 70, Wihdat Camp, Amman. Originally from Deir Tarif 

Arab villages depopulated during the 1948 Arab–Israeli War
District of Ramla